Joel Glazer (born March 31, 1967) is an American businessman and sports team owner. He is part of the Glazer family, who control First Allied Corporation and HRG Group, the Tampa Bay Buccaneers of the National Football League (NFL), and Manchester United Football Club of the Premier League. The family is based in Florida.

Early life and education
Glazer was born to Linda and Malcolm Glazer, a businessman and billionaire. He grew up in Rochester, New York, and attended the American University in Washington, D.C., receiving a degree in Interdisciplinary Studies. He has a wife, Angela, and two daughters, Dylan and Zoey Glazer.

Career
After working alongside his father Malcolm to successfully acquire the Tampa Bay Buccaneers franchise in 1995, Glazer worked in conjunction with his brother, Bryan, to build a community consensus for local approval of what would become Raymond James Stadium. Thereafter, in 2002, he helped lead the Tampa Bay Buccaneers to the franchise first Super Bowl victory vs. the Oakland Raiders on January 26, 2003.  In 2021, The Buccaneers became the first team to play in a Super Bowl at their home stadium, and would go on to win Super Bowl LV, giving the Glazer family their second title.

Glazer, the franchise's co-chairman, represents the franchise at all league meetings since 1995 and is very active in a wide range of NFL matters. During the 2019 offseason, Glazer was appointed chairman of the International Committee by NFL Commissioner Roger Goodell. He also continues his responsibilities on the league's Finance, Media, and Legalized Sports Betting committees.

Glazer also serves as co-chairman of Manchester United Football Club, which has won five Premier League titles (2007, 2008, 2009, 2011 and 2013), one Champions League title (2008), four League Cups (2006, 2009, 2010, 2017), one FA Cup (2016), and one Europa League title (2017) during his tenure. His work with the club led to his naming in 2007 as one of the Top 10 most influential Americans in the United Kingdom by The Telegraph.

Glazer has been active in the Tampa Bay community through the Glazer Family Foundation, which is dedicated to helping children in the Tampa Bay area through charity initiatives. The Foundation donated $5 million toward the construction of the Glazer Children's Museum, in downtown Tampa, which opened in 2010 and was named one of the Top Ten Family Museums in the country by Women's Day Magazine. For its wide-reaching charitable efforts, the Tampa Bay Sports Commission named the Glazer Family Foundation the Foundation of the Year at the inaugural Sneaker Soiree held in 2011.

In 2021, Glazer played a leading role in the attempt to set up a breakaway European Super League which would end the European football pyramid system and replace it with a close league without relegation and promotion. After a strong backlash, Glazer and the other individuals involved backed away from the project.

Awards and honors
 Two-time Super Bowl champion (as Tampa Bay Buccaneers owner/executive)
 2021 Best Team ESPY Award (as Tampa Bay Buccaneers owner/executive)

See also
Glazer ownership of Manchester United

References

Living people
American people of Lithuanian-Jewish descent
American soccer chairmen and investors
American University alumni
Manchester United F.C. directors and chairmen
Businesspeople from Rochester, New York
Tampa Bay Buccaneers executives
Glazer family
American billionaires
Jewish American sportspeople
1967 births
21st-century American Jews
Tampa Bay Buccaneers owners